Clarias maclareni is a critically endangered species of catfish in the family Clariidae. It is endemic to Lake Barombi Mbo in western Cameroon. It is currently threatened because of pollution and sedimentation due to human activities, and potentially also by large emissions of carbon dioxide (CO2) from the lake's bottom (compare Lake Nyos). It is known to grow to  TL. Large individuals feed mainly on other fishes (especially cichlids), while smaller individuals mainly feed on insects.

Named in memory Peter Ian Rupert MacLaren (ca. 1919-1956), who used his position as Fisheries Development Officer of Nigeria to collect fishes for the British Museum, including type specimen of this catfish (from Cameroon) in 1948 (he died from wounds inflicted by a crocodile in what is now Zambia).

References 

 

Endemic fauna of Cameroon
Clarias
Catfish of Africa
Fish of Lake Barombi Mbo
Fish described in 1962
Taxa named by Ethelwynn Trewavas
Taxonomy articles created by Polbot